Salal Airport  is a public use airport located near Salal, Bahr el Gazel, Chad.

See also
List of airports in Chad

References

External links 
 Airport record for Salal Airport at Landings.com

Airports in Chad
Bahr el Gazel Region